Zong Xiao Chen (born 8 March 1998) is a Chinese professional darts player from Dandong who currently plays in Professional Darts Corporation (PDC) events. He is a first winner of the China Premier League. He represented China for two time at the PDC World Darts Championship.

Career
Zong played in the 2017 Shanghai Darts Masters, where he lost 0–6 to James Wade, and later in the year, he won the Chinese Qualifier competition to qualify for the 2018 PDC World Darts Championship. He played against Bernie Smith of New Zealand in the preliminary round, but even though he lost by 0–2 in sets, he set a new national record average of 86.97 in the match.

In the middle of the year, he represented his country with Momo Zhou at the 2018 PDC World Cup of Darts. After a close match, albeit at a low level, China fell in the first round match against Switzerland (Alex Fehlmann and Andy Bless) 2–5 in legs. Later that year, he played in the 2018 Shanghai Darts Masters, where he lost 0–6 to Michael Smith. In November, he competed again in the Chinese Qualifier for the 2019 PDC World Darts Championship, but lost in the qualifying final 2–5 in legs to lower-seeded Yuanjun Liu. Two weeks later, he appeared in his 2018 PDC World Youth Championship, where he was eliminated in the group-stage by Rhys Griffin. Throughout the season, he took part in individual PDC Asian Tour and PDC Development Tour tournaments, but without big success.

In 2019, once again had the opportunity to represent China at the 2019 PDC World Cup of Darts. This time his partner was Yuanjun Liu. The Chinese team was knocked out again in the first round, this time losing to the United States team (Darin Young and Chuck Puleo) 1–5 in legs. In October, he took part in next Chinese qualifying tournament for the 2020 PDC World Darts Championship. In November, he played in the PDC Development Tour competitions and 2019 PDC World Youth Championship, where he was eliminated in the group-stage by Luke Humphries. His rival in the first round of the 2020 PDC World Darts Championship was Kyle Anderson, with whom he lost 2–3 in sets.

The coronavirus pandemic significantly slowed down his career, but he devoted this time to developing his skills. In 2022, was one of the players invited to participate in the PDC China Premier League. He won seven of nine regular matchdays, being unbeaten for 21 matches, finishes the regular phase as leader and he eventually beat all rivals in the final play-offs. Zong beat Zheng Bin 5-0 in the final of the ninth matchday with an impressive average of 101.55, which is new national record average. Despite winning the tournament, Zong will not travel to the 2023 PDC World Darts Championship, because he cannot be vaccinated against coronavirus due to allergies, therefore he cannot compete outside China.

World Championship results

PDC
 2018: Preliminary round (lost to Bernie Smith 0–2) (sets)
 2020: First round (lost to Kyle Anderson 2–3)

Performance timeline

References

External links

1998 births
Professional Darts Corporation associate players
Chinese darts players
Living people
People from Dandong
PDC World Cup of Darts Chinese team